Food Rocks was an attraction at Epcot's The Land pavilion presented by Nestlé in the Walt Disney World Resort. The attraction, a musical stage show, with audio-animatronic figures, opened in 1994.

Synopsis
The show was themed as a benefit concert for good nutrition hosted by Fūd Wrapper, who was voiced by real-life rapper Tone Loc. However, the show was continually interrupted by the Excess, a junk food heavy metal band that detests nutrition. In the end, The Excess lost their power as Wrapper exclaimed, "No power? You guys have been unplugged! There's plenty of foods out there that are good to eat, but remember, always eat in moderation."

The Audio-Animatronic characters were food items with human features. The music was based on popular songs by well-known performers, with lyrics adapted to the topic of nutrition. For example, "The Peach Boys", singing "Good Nutrition", was based on The Beach Boys' song "Good Vibrations". Five of these acts used the voices of the parodied musicians themselves: Tone Loc, Neil Sedaka, Little Richard, The Pointer Sisters, and Chubby Checker. The only character who wasn't an animatronic was "Chubby Cheddar" who appeared as a silhouetted projection on the center stage wall. The lead singer for "The Refrigerator Police" (parody of The Police) was a repurposed version of the Mr. Dairy Goods animatronic from Kitchen Kabaret. Many of the characters returned for the finale.

Tina Turner was offered a role as "Tina Tuna" who would sing a song called "What's Meat Got to Go With It?", but she declined the offer.

History

Food Rocks debuted inside The Land pavilion at Epcot Center on March 26, 1994. It replaced the former audio-animatronic show, "Kitchen Kabaret". Food Rocks closed on January 3, 2004 in order to make room for Soarin'.

Music acts

See also
Epcot attraction and entertainment history

References

 

Notes

External links
 All Ears Net Food Rocks page

Former Walt Disney Parks and Resorts attractions
Epcot
Audio-Animatronic attractions
Future World (Epcot)
1994 establishments in Florida
2004 disestablishments in Florida